Thomas Richmond Webb (c. 1663 – 16 November 1731), of the Middle Temple; St. George's, Hanover Square, Middlesex; and Rodbourne Cheney, Wiltshire, was an English politician.

He was a Member (MP) of the Parliament of England for Calne in 1685–1687, Cricklade in 1702–1705 and Devizes on 16 December 1710 – 1713.

References

1663 births
1731 deaths
People from Wiltshire
People from Mayfair
English MPs 1685–1687
English MPs 1702–1705
Members of the Parliament of Great Britain for English constituencies
British MPs 1710–1713
Serjeants-at-law (England)
Members of Parliament for Cricklade